Air Kokshetau, also legally known as JSC Aircompany Kokshetau ( /), was an airline based in Kokshetau, Akmola Region, Kazakhstan, based at Kokshetau International Airport. It operated a fleet of eight aircraft.

It started operations in 2002, it offered flights to both domestic and international destinations and had 238 employees (at March 2007). In 2010, the airline was shut down.

History
Founded in 1968 as Kokchetavsky Squadron.

Destinations

Air Kokshetau operated scheduled flights from Kokshetau to Almaty, Astana, Petropavl and from Astana to Oral using Yakovlev Yak-40 aircraft.

Fleet 
At closure, the Air Kokshetau fleet included the following aircraft:

Former fleet

In October 2004 the airline acquired ownership of an Airbus A310-300 formerly operated by Air Kazakhstan.

See also
Transport in Kazakhstan
List of airports in Kazakhstan
List of companies of Kazakhstan
Economy of Kazakhstan

References

Defunct airlines of Kazakhstan
Airlines established in 2002
Airlines disestablished in 2008
2002 establishments in Kazakhstan